Elections to Newtownabbey Borough Council were held on 17 May 1989 on the same day as the other Northern Irish local government elections. The election used five district electoral areas to elect a total of 25 councillors.

Election results

Note: "Votes" are the first preference votes.

Districts summary

|- class="unsortable" align="centre"
!rowspan=2 align="left"|Ward
! % 
!Cllrs
! % 
!Cllrs
! %
!Cllrs
! %
!Cllrs
! % 
!Cllrs
!rowspan=2|TotalCllrs
|- class="unsortable" align="center"
!colspan=2 bgcolor="" | UUP
!colspan=2 bgcolor="" | DUP
!colspan=2 bgcolor="" | Alliance
!colspan=2 bgcolor="" | SDLP
!colspan=2 bgcolor="white"| Others
|-
|align="left"|Antrim Line
|bgcolor="#40BFF5"|39.8
|bgcolor="#40BFF5"|2
|21.6
|1
|19.0
|1
|14.3
|1
|5.3
|0
|5
|-
|align="left"|Ballyclare
|bgcolor="#40BFF5"|37.5
|bgcolor="#40BFF5"|2
|17.5
|1
|7.2
|0
|0.0
|0
|37.8
|2
|5
|-
|align="left"|Doagh Road
|bgcolor="#40BFF5"|39.8
|bgcolor="#40BFF5"|2
|17.2
|1
|9.5
|1
|0.0
|0
|33.5
|1
|5
|-
|align="left"|Manse Road
|bgcolor="#40BFF5"|63.5
|bgcolor="#40BFF5"|3
|15.2
|1
|15.5
|1
|0.0
|0
|5.8
|0
|5
|-
|align="left"|Shore Road
|bgcolor="#40BFF5"|46.6
|bgcolor="#40BFF5"|2
|25.9
|2
|18.1
|1
|0.0
|0
|9.4
|0
|5
|-
|- class="unsortable" class="sortbottom" style="background:#C9C9C9"
|align="left"| Total
|45.8
|11
|19.5
|6
|14.0
|4
|3.1
|1
|17.6
|3
|25
|-
|}

Districts results

Antrim Line

1985: 2 x UUP, 2 x DUP, 1 x Alliance
1989: 2 x UUP, 1 x DUP, 1 x Alliance, 1 x SDLP
1985-1989 Change: SDLP gain from DUP

Ballyclare

1985: 2 x Independent Unionist, 1 x UUP, 1 x DUP, 1 x Independent
1989: 2 x Independent Unionist, 2 x UUP, 1 x DUP
1985-1989 Change: UUP gain from Independent

Doagh Road

1985: 2 x UUP, 2 x DUP, 1 x Newtownabbey Labour
1989: 2 x UUP, 1 x DUP, 1 x Alliance, 1 x Labour '87
1985-1989 Change: Alliance gain from DUP, Newtownabbey Labour joins Labour '87

Manse Road

1985: 3 x UUP, 2 x DUP
1989: 3 x UUP, 1 x DUP, 1 x Alliance
1985-1989 Change: Alliance gain from DUP

Shore Road

1985: 2 x UUP, 2 x DUP, 1 x Alliance
1989: 2 x UUP, 2 x DUP, 1 x Alliance
1985-1989 Change: No change

References

Newtownabbey Borough Council elections
Newtownabbey